Koh Myong-jin (born January 9, 1988) is a South Korean professional football player who plays as a midfielder for Ulsan Hyundai in K League 1.

Club career 
He joined FC Seoul, then known as the Anyang LG Cheetahs, in 2003. In 2015 he moved to Al-Rayyan. In September 2019, he moved to Slaven Belupo in Croatia, but left the club two months later.

He moved back to South Korea to join Ulsan Hyundai FC ahead of the 2020 K League 1 season. In his first season with Ulsan, he helped them win the 2020 AFC Champions League for the second time in the club's history.

International career 
On 23 May 2011, he was called up to the South Korea national team for the friendly matches against Serbia and Ghana, though he did not play. He made his national team debut in a friendly match against Australia on 14 November 2012 in a 1–2 loss.

Career statistics

Club
Correct as of 30 July 2022

Honours

Club 
FC Seoul
K League 1
Winners (2): 2010, 2012
League Cup
Winners (2): 2006, 2010
AFC Champions League
Runners-up (1): 2013
FA Cup
Runners-up (1): 2014

Al-Rayyan
Qatar Stars League: 2015–16

Ulsan Hyundai
AFC Champions League: 2020

Individual
K League Best XI : 2014

References

External links
 
 Koh Myong-jin – National Team Stats at KFA 
 

1988 births
Living people
South Korean footballers
Association football midfielders
South Korean expatriate footballers
FC Seoul players
Al-Rayyan SC players
NK Slaven Belupo players
K League 1 players
Qatar Stars League players
Croatian Football League players
South Korean expatriate sportspeople in Qatar
South Korean expatriate sportspeople in Croatia
Expatriate footballers in Qatar
Expatriate footballers in Croatia
People from Suwon
South Korea under-23 international footballers
South Korea international footballers
Sportspeople from Gyeonggi Province